Blaise Kopogo (born 1972) is a football manager who is last known to have managed .

Career

In 2015, Kopogo was appointed manager of Central African Republic after Central African Republic expatriate players asked for a Central African Republic expatriate manager, using him as their candidate. In 2019. he was appointed manager of French sixth division club .

References

External links

1972 births
Living people
Central African Republic national football team managers
Central African Republic football managers